Valter Chrintz (born 26 April 2000) is a Swedish handball player for Füchse Berlin and the Swedish national team.

He made international debut on the Swedish national team on 12 March 2019.

He participated at the 2020 European Men's Handball Championship in Sweden, and the 2021 World Men's Handball Championship in Egypt.

Achievements
Swedish Champion with IFK Kristianstad
 Winner: 2018
 Bronze Medalist: 2019
EHF European League with Füchse Berlin
 Silver Medalist: 2021

References

External links

2000 births
Living people
People from Kristianstad Municipality
Swedish male handball players
IFK Kristianstad players
Expatriate handball players
Swedish expatriate sportspeople in Germany
Sportspeople from Skåne County
Füchse Berlin Reinickendorf HBC players